Catharine Parr Traill (born Strickland; 9 January 1802 – 29 August 1899) was an English-Canadian author and naturalist who wrote about life in Canada, particularly what is now Ontario (then the colony of Upper Canada). In the 1830s, Canada covered an area considerably smaller than today. At the time, most of Upper Canada had not been explored by European settlers.

Throughout her long life, Traill wrote to generate income in support of her family. She wrote 24 books covering topics ranging from her life as a settler in Ontario to natural history, especially botany. Traill is considered a pioneer of Canada's natural history. Through her writing, she related the colonial experience and described the natural environment of Upper Canada for English readers.

Traill is considered an amateur botanist, because at the time, it was not possible for women to hold professional, paid positions.

Early years

Catharine Parr Strickland was born in the district of Rotherhithe in Southwark (then in Surrey, today part of Greater London) in 1802, fifth child out of eight, of Thomas Strickland and Elizabeth Homer. Catharine had four older sisters - Elizabeth, Agnes, Sarah and Jane Margaret - and a younger sister, Susanna, as well as two younger brothers, Samuel and Thomas.  Her father retired from his position as manager of the Greenland Docks on the River Thames and moved the family to the countryside in Suffolk, shortly after her birth. She grew up in East Anglia, first near Bungay, and later Southwold and was educated at home. After Thomas Strickland died in 1818, Catharine and her sisters turned to writing and editorial work as the main source of family income.

Career
Sister to fellow authors Agnes Strickland, Jane Margaret Strickland, Susanna Moodie, and Elisabeth Strickland, Traill was the first of her siblings to commence writing. She began writing children's books in 1818 after the death of her father. Traill's first book The tell tale: an original collection of moral and amusing stories appeared anonymously in 1818; she was only 16. Her early works, such as Disobedience, or Mind What Mama Says (1819) and "Happy Because Good", were written for children, and often dwell on the benefits of obedience to one's parents. A prolific author, until her marriage she averaged one book per year. In 1832, she married Lieutenant Thomas Traill, a retired officer of the Napoleonic Wars and a friend of her sister's husband, John Moodie, despite objections from her family (aside from Susanna). Soon after their marriage, they left for Upper Canada, settling near Peterborough, where her brother Samuel was a surveyor. Her sister, Mrs. Susanna Moodie, emigrated soon afterwards.

She described her new life in letters and journals and collected these into The Backwoods of Canada (1836), which continues to be read as an important source of information about early Canada. She describes everyday life in the community, the relationship between Canadians, Americans, and Indigenous peoples, the climate, and local flora and fauna. 

More observations were included in a novel, Canadian Crusoes (1851). She also collected information concerning the skills necessary for a new settler, published in The Female Emigrant's Guide (1854), later retitled The Canadian Settler's Guide. She wrote  "Pearls and Pebbles" and "Cot and Cradle Stories".

After suffering through the depression of 1836, her husband Thomas joined the militia in 1837 to fight against the Upper Canada Rebellion. In 1840, dissatisfied with life in "the backwoods," the Traills and the Moodies both moved to the city of Belleville. While Susanna was more concerned with the differences between rural and urban life, Catharine spent her years in Belleville writing about the natural environment. She often sketched the plant life of Upper Canada, publishing Canadian Wild Flowers (1868), Studies of Plant Life in Canada (1885) and "Rambles in the Canadian Forest".

She received a grant c. 1899 from the Royal Bounty Fund, which was supplemented by a subscription from her friends in Canada, headed by Sir Sandford Fleming. She died at her residence, "Westove," in Lakefield, Ontario on 28 August 1899.

Her many albums of plant collections are housed in the National Herbarium of Canada at the Canadian Museum of Nature.

Recognition
Trent University, in Peterborough, Ontario, named their downtown campus after her. Catharine Parr Traill College is the university's main college for graduate studies.

Commemorative postage stamp
On 8 September 2003, to commemorate the 50th anniversary of the National Library of Canada, Canada Post released a special commemorative series, "The Writers of Canada", designed by Katalina Kovats and featuring two English-Canadian and two French-Canadian stamps. Three million stamps were issued. Traill and her sister Susanna Moodie were featured on one of the English-Canadian stamps.

Selected bibliography
 The Tell Tale – 1818
 Disobedience – 1819
 Reformation – 1819
 Nursery Fables – 1821
 Little Downy – 1822
 The Flower-Basket – 1825
 Prejudice Reproved – 1826
 The Young Emigrants – 1826
 The Juvenile Forget-Me-Not – 1827
The Step Brothers – 1828
 The Keepsake Guineas – 1828
 Amendment – 1828
 Sketches from Nature – 1830
 Sketch Book of a Young Naturalist – 1831
 Narratives of Nature – 1831
 The Backwoods of Canada – 1836
 Canadian Crusoes – 1852
 The Female Emigrant's Guide – 1854
 Lady Mary and Her Nurse – 1856
 Canadian Wild Flowers – 1868, with illustrations by Agnes Dunbar Moodie FitzgibbonAfar in the Forest; or, Pictures of Life and Scenery in the Wilds of Canada – 1869
 Studies of plant life in Canada, or, Gleanings from forest, lake and plain – 1885
 Pearls and Pebbles or Notes of an Old Naturalist – 1894
 Traill, Catherine Parr Strickland, (1996). I bless you in my heart : selected correspondence of Catharine Parr Traill. Ballstadt, Carl, 1931-, Hopkins, Elizabeth, BA., Peterman, Michael A., 1942-. Toronto: University of Toronto Press. p. 3. . OCLC 36640963.
 Cot and Cradle Stories'' – 1895

References

Further reading

External links

 Information about Traill and her sister Moodie from the Libraries and Archives Canada
 
 
 
 
 
 Traill, Catherine Parr Strickland.
The Canadian Crusoes; a tale of the Rice Lake plains. New York : C.S. Francis & Co., 1853. Accessed 18 July 2012, in PDF format.
The female emigrant's guide, and hints on Canadian housekeeping (also published under title: The Canadian settler's guide (1855).). Toronto, C.W. : Maclear & Co., 1854. Accessed 18 July 2012, in PDF format.
The Canadian emigrant housekeeper's guide. Toronto : Lovell & Gibson, 1862. Accessed 18 July 2012, in PDF format. (Includes some of the material in The female emigrant's guide, with an appendix of official information and statistics to 1861.)
 The Chamberlin Digital Collection with books and botanical illustrations

1802 births
1899 deaths
Canadian children's writers
Canadian travel writers
Canadian memoirists
English travel writers
British women travel writers
English children's writers
English emigrants to pre-Confederation Ontario
People from Rotherhithe
Victorian women writers
Persons of National Historic Significance (Canada)
Canadian women botanists
19th-century Canadian novelists
19th-century Canadian women writers
19th-century Canadian botanists
19th-century Canadian women scientists
Women naturalists
Canadian women memoirists
Canadian women children's writers
British women children's writers
Canadian women novelists
Immigrants to Upper Canada
19th-century memoirists